Liv Køltzow (born 14 January 1945) is a Norwegian novelist, playwright, biographer and essayist.

Personal life
Køltzow was born in Oslo to Oscar Køltzow and Else Mathisen. She was married to writer Espen Haavardsholm from 1966 to 1973, and to Kjell Heggelund from 1985.

Career
Køltzow published texts in the modernist literary magazine Profil. She was regarded as one of the central Norwegian feminist writers during the 1970s, and the short novel Hvem bestemmer over Bjørg og Unni? (1972) has been called Norway's first pamphlet of the militant and socialist feminism in the 1970s.

Her novel Historien om Eli from 1975 deals with psychological aspects of individuals. The novel was also translated into Swedish and Danish language. Further books are the novel Løp, mann from 1980, two stories in the collection April/November (1983), and the novel Hvem har ditt ansikt? from 1988.

She received Gyldendal's Endowment in 1988, and was the first winner of the Amalie Skram Prize, in 1994. The novel Hvem har ditt ansikt was nominated for the Nordic Council's Literature Prize in 1989, but did not win the prize. She was awarded the Brage Prize in 1997 for the novel Verden forsvinner.

In 2002 she published the novel Det avbrutte bildet, and in 2004 the essay collection Essays 1975–2004. She has also written two biographical volumes on Amalie Skram, published in 1992 and 1996. She was awarded the Gyldendal Prize in 2015. Køltzow received the Aschehoug Prize in 2018, for the novel Melding til alle reisende.

Selected bibliography
 Øyet i treet - (1970) 
 Hvem bestemmer over Bjørg og Unni? - (1972) 
 Historien om Eli - (1975) 
 Løp, mann - (1980) 
 April/November - (1983) 
 Hvem har ditt ansikt - (1988) 
 Den unge Amalie Skram - biography (1992)  
 Verden forsvinner - (1997) 
 Det avbrutte bildet - (2002)
 ''Melding til alle reisende - (2018)

Awards 
Mads Wiel Nygaards Endowment 1975
Gyldendal's Endowment 1988
Amalie Skram Prize 1994
Brage Prize 1997
Gyldendal Prize 2015
Aschehoug Prize 2018

References

1945 births
Living people
Writers from Oslo
20th-century Norwegian novelists
21st-century Norwegian novelists
Norwegian essayists
Norwegian biographers
Norwegian feminists
Norwegian women novelists
Norwegian women essayists
Norwegian socialist feminists
21st-century Norwegian women writers
20th-century Norwegian women writers
20th-century essayists
21st-century essayists
Women biographers